Patrick Russel (born 22 December 1946) is a former French Alpine ski racer and World Cup champion.  He specialized in the technical disclipines (giant slalom and slalom) and won three discipline championships in the World Cup: slalom in 1969 and 1970 and giant slalom in 1971.  He also won two silver medals in slalom and combined at the 1970 World Championships at Val Gardena, Italy.

Career
Russel was the son of Lee Russel, who was a marketing executive at the French ski manufacturer Rossignol.  He competed on the World Cup circuit from 1968 through 1972 and became the first male to win World Cup races in three straight years (1968–70) and in four straight years (1968–71).  Overall, he won 13 World Cup races and achieved 26 podiums during his career, as well as three discipline championships (slalom in 1969 and 1970; giant slalom in 1971) and two World Championship silver medals in 1970.  In 1970, he finished second overall in the World Cup (only 3 points) behind Karl Schranz, and in 1971 he was third overall behind Gustav Thöni.

In 1972, Russel broke his leg during a giant slalom in Berchtesgaden, West Germany, three weeks before the Winter Olympics and was unable to compete for the remainder of the season.  After the French men failed to medal during the Olympics, the French ski coach was replaced, and the new coach fired French stars Russel, Henri Duvillard and Jean-Noël Augert from the World Cup team at the start of 1973.  It has been suggested that a conflict between the two alpine cultures (alpine and urban) provoked by Bozon and Rossignol caused the firings, the three racers involved being encouraged to not take both training and races seriously just before they were fired. The coaches themselves resigned. Bozon got what he wanted and in the process destroyed the French ski team for years thereafter. All three skiers then turned professional and competed in the United States until their retirements.

After his retirement from competition, Russel became a ski instructor in France at Les Arcs.

World Cup victories

Season titles

Individual victories
13 total wins
(9 slalom, 4 giant slalom)

References

External links
 

French male alpine skiers
Living people
1946 births
FIS Alpine Ski World Cup champions
People from Chamonix
Sportspeople from Haute-Savoie